Pediasia yangtseella is a moth in the family Crambidae. It was described by Aristide Caradja in 1939. It is found in Xizang and Yunnan in China.

References

Crambini
Moths described in 1939
Moths of Asia